is a 1995 action role-playing game developed by Nihon Falcom. It is the fifth game in the Ys series of video games and was released for the Super Famicom in December 1995. A remake by Arc System Works and Taito was released for the PlayStation 2 in 2006.

Plot

Adol is traveling through new lands, in search of more adventure, when he hears of the vanished desert city of Kefin. He sets off to investigate this ancient city's disappearance.

Gameplay

The RPG-style statistical elements and the overhead view of most of the previous games are retained in Ys V. As in Ys III, there is no auto-attack; the player must press a button to swing Adol's sword. Adol is also given the ability to jump and defend with his shield. A new magic system is introduced in Ys V as well, which requires the player to charge up spells by holding a button before they can be cast. Adol must level up physical skills and magical skills separately.

Release 
Ys V was originally released on December 29, 1995 in Japan for the Super Famicom. In 1996, Falcom released a second version of the game for the Super Famicom with a higher difficulty level, known as Ys V Expert.

A remake of Ys V was developed by Arc System Works and published by Taito for the PlayStation 2 on March 30, 2006.

Reception
Japanese publication Famitsu gave the original SFC version of the game a score of 26 out of 40. Famitsu also scored the PS2 release of Ys V a 28 out of 40. Super GamePower gave it a 4/5.

References

External links
  via Internet Archive

1995 video games
Action role-playing video games
Japan-exclusive video games
Nihon Falcom games
PlayStation 2 games
Single-player video games
Super Nintendo Entertainment System games
Video games developed in Japan
Ys (series)
Arc System Works games